Jonas Reece Emrie (April 25, 1812 – June 5, 1869) was a U.S. Representative from Ohio.

Born in Hillsboro, Ohio, Emrie pursued preparatory studies.
He studied law.
He was admitted to the bar and commenced practice in Hillsboro, Ohio.
He was editor and publisher of the Hillsboro Gazette 1839–1848 and 1854–1856.
Leader in organizing the Hillsboro Female College.
He was appointed postmaster of Hillsboro on April 8, 1839, and served until February 23, 1841.
He served as member of the State senate in 1847 and 1848.
First probate judge of Highland County 1851–1854.

Emrie was elected as an Opposition Party candidate to the Thirty-fourth Congress (March 4, 1855 – March 3, 1857).
He was an unsuccessful candidate for reelection in 1856 to the Thirty-fifth Congress.
He moved to Mound City, Illinois, in 1857.
He engaged in mercantile pursuits, conducted a newspaper, and practiced law.
Police magistrate of the city in 1858.
Township treasurer of schools.
He served as master in chancery of Pulaski County, Illinois.
He died in Mound City, Illinois, June 5, 1869.
He was interred in Beech Grove Cemetery.

References

1812 births
1869 deaths
People from Hillsboro, Ohio
Opposition Party members of the United States House of Representatives from Ohio
Ohio state senators
Ohio lawyers
19th-century American newspaper publishers (people)
People from Mound City, Illinois
Ohio state court judges
19th-century American journalists
American male journalists
19th-century American male writers
19th-century American politicians
Journalists from Ohio
Journalists from Illinois
19th-century American judges
19th-century American lawyers